Floyd Morgenstern (born June 25, 1910, date of death unknown) was an American composer. His work was part of the music event in the art competition at the 1932 Summer Olympics.

References

1910 births
Year of death missing
American male composers
Olympic competitors in art competitions
People from St. Clair County, Illinois